Myrrha is the mother of Adonis in Greek mythology.

Myrrha may also refer to:

 Myrrha, a character from Lord Byron's play Sardanapalus
 Myrrha (Caplet cantata), a cantata by André Caplet
 Myrrha (Ravel cantata), a cantata by Maurice Ravel
 381 Myrrha, a very large main-belt asteroid
 Libythea myrrha, a butterfly of India
 Myrrha (beetle), a genus of ladybug beetles
 Myrrha octodecimguttata a species of ladybug
 Polyommatus myrrha, a butterfly of Turkey and the Caucuses
 Commiphora myrrha, is a tree in the Burseraceae family
 MYRRHA, a developmental nuclear reactor designed by SCK•CEN
"Myrrha", a short story by Gary Jennings

See also
 Myrrh (disambiguation)